Alexander Vinogradov  is a Russian operatic bass. He began his music education at the age of 7, starting with the piano and the clarinet. From 1994 to 1995 he was a student at the Moscow State Technical University. Vinogradov became a student of the Moscow Conservatory in 1995.

He has performed with orchestras such as Staatskapelle Berlin, Simon Bolivar Youth Orchestra,  Bayerischer Rundfunk, Deutsches Symphonie Orchester, RAI Torino, Orchestra Filarmonica della Scala,  Montreal Symphony, Russian National Orchestra, Baltimore Symphony, Gürzenich Orchestra Cologne, Radio Philharmonic Orchestra in Amsterdam, RTÉ Symphony Orchestra, Konzerthaus Vienna and Berlin.

References

External links 

Askonas Holt

1976 births
Living people
Moscow Conservatory alumni
Moscow Institute of Physics and Technology alumni
Operatic basses
Russian basses
20th-century Russian male opera singers
21st-century Russian male opera singers